Anthony Richard Balfour (born 19 December 1949) is a Bahamian athlete. He competed in the men's high jump at the 1968 Summer Olympics.

References

External links
 

1949 births
Living people
Athletes (track and field) at the 1967 Pan American Games
Athletes (track and field) at the 1968 Summer Olympics
Bahamian male high jumpers
Olympic athletes of the Bahamas
Place of birth missing (living people)
Pan American Games competitors for the Bahamas